Penn Farm may refer to:

 Penn Farm Agricultural History Center, in Cedar Hill State Park
 Penn Farm of the Trustees of the New Castle Common, near New Castle, New Castle County, Delaware
 Mulberry Island Plantation, Stoneville, North Carolina
 Chinqua Penn Plantation, Reidsville, North Carolina

See also
 Penn Farms, Pennsylvania
 Penney Farms, Florida